William Pusey may refer to:
 William A. Pusey, American physician
 William Henry Mills Pusey, U.S. Representative from Iowa